The Income Tax (Earnings and Pensions) Act 2003 (c 1) is an Act of the Parliament of the United Kingdom.

It restated certain legislation relating to income tax "so as to make it clearer and easier to use". The Bill was the work of the Tax Law Rewrite Project team at the Inland Revenue.

Sections relating to the pensions of Members of the House of Commons were amended by the House of Commons Members' Fund Act 2016.

Part 1

Section 1
Section 1(2) was repealed by Part 1 of Schedule 3 to the Income Tax Act 2007.

Part 2

Chapter 5

Section 20
Sections 20(2)(b) and (c) were repealed by paragraph 11(3) of Schedule 7 to the Finance Act 2008.

Section 21
This section was repealed by paragraph 13 of Schedule 7 to the Finance Act 2008.

Section 25
This section was repealed by paragraph 18 of Schedule 7 to the Finance Act 2008.

Sections 31 to 37
Sections 31 to 37, and the cross heading before section 31, were repealed by paragraph 21 of Schedule 7 to the Finance Act 2008.

Chapter 6
This Chapter consisted of sections 42 and 43. This Chapter was repealed by paragraph 23 of Schedule 7 to the Finance Act 2008.

Chapter 7

Section 47
This section was repealed by section 16(6) of the Finance Act 2014.

Chapter 8

Section 49
Section 49(2) was repealed by Part 3(1) of Schedule 43 to the Finance Act 2003.

Section 56
Section 56(7)(c) was repealed by Part 3(1) of Schedule 43 to the Finance Act 2003. Section 56(8) was repealed by Part 3 of Schedule 42 to the Finance Act 2004.

Section 58
Section 58(6) was repealed by paragraph 61(2) of Schedule 1 to the Finance Act 2016.

Chapter 9

Section 61H
Section 61H(6) was repealed by paragraph 61(2) of Schedule 1 to the Finance Act 2016.

Part 3

Chapter 2

Section 63
Sections 63(2) to (4) were repealed by paragraph 5(3) of Schedule 1 to the Finance Act 2015.

Section 64
Sections 64(5) and (6) were repealed by Part 3(4) of Schedule 43 to the Finance Act 2003.

Section 65
This section was repealed by section 12(2) of the Finance Act 2015.

Chapter 4

Section 87
Section 87(6) was repealed by paragraph 50(2)(a) of Schedule 39 to the Finance Act 2012.

Section 89
This section was repealed by paragraph 50(1) of Schedule 39 to the Finance Act 2012.

Section 95
Section 95(1)(b) was repealed by section 12(4)(a) of the Finance Act 2015.

Section 96
This section was repealed by section 12(3) of the Finance Act 2015.

Chapter 6

Section 148
Section 148(3) was repealed by paragraph 7 of Schedule 1 to the Finance Act 2015.

Section 157
Section 157(3) was repealed by paragraph 8 of Schedule 1 to the Finance Act 2015.

Section 169
Sections 169(3) and (4) were repealed by paragraph 9(3) of Schedule 1 to the Finance Act 2015.

Section 169A
Sections 169A(3) and (4) were repealed by paragraph 10(3) of Schedule 1 to the Finance Act 2015.

Chapters 8 and 9
These Chapters were repealed by Part 3(4) of Schedule 43 to the Finance Act 2003.

Chapter 12

Section 224
This section was repealed by Part 3 of Schedule 42 to the Finance Act 2004.

Part 4

Chapter 1

Section 227
Sections 227(4)(d), (f) and (h) were repealed by Part 3(4) of Schedule 43 to the Finance Act 2003.

Chapter 3

Section 239
Section 239(9) was repealed by paragraph 14(3) of Schedule 1 to the Finance Act 2015.

Chapter 11

Section 320
Sections 320(4) and (5) were repealed by Part 2(8) of Schedule 42 to the  Finance Act 2004.

Part 6

Chapter 1
This Chapter was repealed by Part 3 of Schedule 42 to the Finance Act 2004.

Chapter 3

Section 407
Section 407(3) was repealed by Part 3 of Schedule 42 to the Finance Act 2004.

Section 408
Section 408(2) was repealed by Part 3 of Schedule 42 to the Finance Act 2004.

Part 7

Chapter 1

Section 421G
This section was repealed by Part 2(11) of Schedule 42 to the  Finance Act 2004.

Chapter 2

Section 429
Section 429(5) was repealed by Part 2(11) of Schedule 42 to the  Finance Act 2004.

Chapter 3

Section 443
Section 443(5) was repealed by Part 2(11) of Schedule 42 to the  Finance Act 2004.

Chapter 3C
Section 446R(5) was repealed by Part 2(11) of Schedule 42 to the  Finance Act 2004.

Chapter 4

Section 449
Section 449(4) was repealed by Part 2(11) of Schedule 42 to the  Finance Act 2004.

Chapter 5

Section 480
Section 480(7) was repealed by Part 2(10) of Schedule 42 to the  Finance Act 2004.

Chapter 6

Section 491
This section was repealed by Part 3(4) of Schedule 43 to the Finance Act 2003.

Section 492
Section 492(2) was repealed by Part 3 of Schedule 42 to the Finance Act 2004.

Sections 494 and 495
These sections were repealed by Part 3(4) of Schedule 43 to the Finance Act 2003.

Section 515
Sections 515(1)(b) and (3) were repealed by Part 1 of Schedule 3 to the Income Tax Act 2007.

Chapter 7

Section 518
This section was repealed by Part 3(4) of Schedule 43 to the Finance Act 2003.

Section 519
Section 519(4) was repealed by Part 3(4) of Schedule 43 to the Finance Act 2003.

Section 520
This section was repealed by Part 3(4) of Schedule 43 to the Finance Act 2003.

Chapter 8

Section 523
This section was repealed by Part 3(4) of Schedule 43 to the Finance Act 2003.

Section 524
Section 524(4) was repealed by Part 3(4) of Schedule 43 to the Finance Act 2003.

Section 525
This section was repealed by Part 3(4) of Schedule 43 to the Finance Act 2003.

Chapter 9

Section 528
This section was repealed by Part 3(4) of Schedule 43 to the Finance Act 2003.

Part 9
Chapters 6 to 9, 13 and 16 were repealed by Part 3 of Schedule 42 to the Finance Act 2004.

Chapter 5

Section 577
Section 577(3) was repealed by Part 2(12) of Schedule 42 to the  Finance Act 2004.

Part 11

Chapter 1

Section 683
Section 683(4) was repealed by Part 3 of Schedule 42 to the Finance Act 2004.

Chapter 4

Section 701
Section 701(2)(c)(ii) was repealed by Part 2(11) of Schedule 42 to the  Finance Act 2004.

Part 13

Section 721
Section 721(2) was repealed by Part 1 of Schedule 3 to the Income Tax Act 2007.

Schedule 2
Paragraphs 18(1)(a) and 47(3) were repealed by Part 3(3) of Schedule 43 to the Finance Act 2003.

Schedule 5
Paragraphs 11(2)(a) to (c) and (3) were repealed by Part 2(13) of Schedule 42 to the  Finance Act 2004.

Schedule 6
Paragraphs 2, 45, 48, 50, 51, 100, 108, 166, 226 and 256 were repealed by Part 1 of Schedule 3 to the Income Tax Act 2007. Paragraphs 36 and 119 were repealed by paragraph 28(1) of Schedule 39 to the Finance Act 2012. Paragraphs 58, 59, 60 and 61 were repealed by Part 2(7) of Schedule 42 to the Finance Act 2004. Paragraphs 166(3) and 245 were repealed by Part 2(12) of Schedule 42 to the  Finance Act 2004. Paragraphs 72, 73, 79, 80 (1) to (5), 82, 89, 90, 92 to 95, 97, 98, 99, 125(3) and 161 were repealed by Part 3 of Schedule 42 to the Finance Act 2004.

Schedule 7
Paragraphs 9 to 12 were repealed by paragraph 44 of Schedule 7 to the Finance Act 2008. Paragraphs 15, 16, 19 and 20 were repealed by section 12(4)(b) of the Finance Act 2015. Paragraph 17(4) was repealed by paragraph 22(2)(b) of Schedule 1 to the Finance Act 2015. Paragraph 18 was repealed by paragraph 50(2)(b) of Schedule 39 to the Finance Act 2012. Paragraph 24 was repealed by Part 2(9) of Schedule 42 to the  Finance Act 2004. Paragraphs 30, 31, 47, 48, 50 to 53, 55(2)(a), 59 to 62, 66 and 67 were repealed by Part 3(4) of Schedule 43 to the Finance Act 2003. Paragraph 41 repealed by Part 3 of Schedule 42 to the Finance Act 2004.

Schedule 21
Paragraph 18(4) was repealed by Part 2(11) of Schedule 42 to the  Finance Act 2004.

See also
Taxation in the United Kingdom

References
Halsbury's Statutes,

External links
The Income Tax (Earnings and Pensions) Act 2003, as amended from the National Archives.
The Income Tax (Earnings and Pensions) Act 2003, as originally enacted from the National Archives.
Explanatory notes to the Income Tax (Earnings and Pensions) Act 2003.

United Kingdom Acts of Parliament 2003
Income tax in the United Kingdom